The 64th Golden Globe Awards were aired on January 15, 2007.

The ceremony was broadcast live on NBC. Indicating the impact that animated films have had on the film industry, the Hollywood Foreign Press Association announced in early 2006 that a Golden Globe would be awarded for the Best Animated Feature for the first time at this award ceremony.

Dreamgirls won the most awards, with 3 (including Best Motion Picture – Musical or Comedy). Babel, received the most nominations, with 7 (only winning 1, for Best Motion Picture – Drama).

Winners and nominees

These are the nominees for the 64th Golden Globe Awards. Winners are listed at the top of each list.

Nominations announced on December 14, 2006.

Film

Television

Awards breakdown
The following films and programs received multiple nominations:

Film

Television 

The following films and programs received multiple wins:

Film

Television

Ceremony

Presenters 

 Tim Allen
 David Arquette
 Drew Barrymore
 Jessica Biel
 Steve Carell
 George Clooney
 Sean Combs
 Dane Cook
 Courteney Cox
 Geena Davis
 Cameron Diaz
 Tina Fey
 Jamie Foxx
 Jennifer Garner
 Hugh Grant
 Adrian Grenier
 Greg Grunberg
 Jake Gyllenhaal
 Tom Hanks
 Salma Hayek
 Jennifer Love Hewitt
 Dustin Hoffman
 Philip Seymour Hoffman
 Djimon Hounsou
 Terrence Howard
 Felicity Huffman
 Eva Longoria
 Jennifer Lopez
 Sienna Miller
 Masi Oka
 Hayden Panettiere
 Sarah Jessica Parker
 Joaquin Phoenix
 Arnold Schwarzenegger
 Charlie Sheen
 David Spade
 Steven Spielberg
 John Stamos
 Ben Stiller
 Sharon Stone
 Hilary Swank
 Justin Timberlake
 Milo Ventimiglia
 Naomi Watts
 Rachel Weisz
 Vanessa Williams
 Reese Witherspoon
 James Woods
 Renee Zellweger

Cecil B. DeMille Award 
Warren Beatty

Miss Golden Globe 
Lorraine Nicholson (daughter of Jack Nicholson & Rebecca Broussard)

Isaiah Washington press conference controversy 
At the winners press conference referencing a scandal over alleged remarks to costar of Grey's Anatomy T.R. Knight, Washington said "No I did not call him a faggot" as executive producer Shonda Rhimes and other cast members looked on. Katherine Heigl would condemn Washington for his remarks and this would lead to Washington's eventual exit from the show as the atmosphere on set was not good.

See also
 79th Academy Awards
 27th Golden Raspberry Awards
 13th Screen Actors Guild Awards
 58th Primetime Emmy Awards
 59th Primetime Emmy Awards
 60th British Academy Film Awards
 61st Tony Awards
 2006 in film
 2006 in American television

References

External links

064
2006 film awards
2006 television awards
January 2007 events in the United States
Golden